Dex One Corporation was an American marketing company providing online, mobile and print search marketing via their DexKnows.com website, print yellow pages directories and pay-per-click ad networks in the U.S.

In April 2013 Dex One merged with SuperMedia, and the combined company (after further acquisitions) now does business as Thryv Inc.

History
Dex One Corporation was originally established as the R.H. Donnelley Company in 1886 by Reuben H. Donnelley, son of RR Donnelley founder Richard R. Donnelley. R.H. Donnelley primarily contracted with The Chicago Telephone Company to publish telephone directories for Chicago telephone customers. In 1906, the company began contracting with Bell System firms such as New York Telephone, Wisconsin Telephone, and Cincinnati Suburban Telephone Co.

In 1917, The R.H. Donnelley Company was incorporated and moved to New York City, retaining some offices in Chicago. In 1929, Reuben Donnelley died; his company remained and continued to contract with the Bell System to publish telephone directories nationally.

In 1961, R. H. Donnelley became a wholly owned subsidiary of Dun & Bradstreet.

Partnerships
Following its merger with Dun & Bradstreet, the company began a series of partnerships with additional telephone companies to publish directories. Around this time, competition started with other phone companies to provide directories.

From 1980 to 1985, R.H. Donnelley began a partnership with United Telephone (Sprint), called Uni-Don, to publish telephone directories to customers in central Florida.

In 1986, it contracted with NYNEX to become its directory sales agent. The same year, R.H. Donnelley started publishing directories in Delaware, New Jersey, and Pennsylvania in competition with Bell Atlantic, although a lot of these areas were later sold off to Yellow Book.

In 1988, it formed Cen-Don with Centel (now part of CenturyLink) to publish telephone directories in Florida, Illinois, Iowa, Minnesota, Nevada, North Carolina, Ohio, and Virginia. Venture One was formed with Southwestern Bell Corporation, which published directories in competition with Bell Atlantic in Baltimore, MD and Washington, D.C.

In 1990, DonTech was formed with Ameritech to publish telephone directories in Illinois and northwest Indiana.

Public offering
On July 1, 1998, Dun & Bradstreet split into two companies, one assuming the Dun & Bradstreet name, while the other adopting the R.H. Donnelley name.

In 2002, R.H. Donnelley acquired Sprint Directory Publishing, the publishing unit of Sprint Corp.

In 2003, R.H. Donnelley Publishing & Advertising, Inc., which published  directories under the EMBARQ Yellow Pages name, was acquired from the Sprint Corporation.

In 2004, R.H. Donnelley acquired the directory publishing business of SBC Communications in Illinois and northwest Indiana, along with the SBC interest in DonTech. As a result, R.H. Donnelley gained a 50-year licensing agreement to use the SBC Yellow Pages name on all directories published for SBC Illinois customers. Following the AT&T merger, the directories were known as "AT&T Yellow Pages published by R.H. Donnelley".

In 2006, R.H. Donnelley completed its acquisition of Dex Media, which had been spun off from Qwest in 2002-2003. Following the acquisition, R.H. Donnelley became the third largest directory publisher in the United States.

In January 2007, R.H. Donnelley bought Local Launch Search Marketing to add strength to its online marketing division for its yellow pages.

In July 2007, R.H. Donnelley bought Business.com.

On December 31, 2008, the New York Stock Exchange (NYSE) suspended trading of R.H. Donnelley because the company's market capitalization was less than $25 million for 30 consecutive trading days, which failed to meet the Exchange's listing standards. As a result of this suspension, R.H. Donnelley began trading its common stock over-the-counter (OTC) on the Pink Sheets beginning on January 2, 2009, under the symbol "RHDC".

In June 2009, R.H. Donnelley Corporation and its subsidiaries filed for bankruptcy.  In February 2010, R.H. Donnelley Corporation emerged from bankruptcy as Dex One Corporation.

On February 1, 2010, the New York Stock Exchange (NYSE) started trading 50 million Dex One Corporation shares under the "DEXO" ticker symbol.

Merger with SuperMedia
On August 21, 2012, Dex One and SuperMedia announced a stock for stock merger transaction. The merger closed on April 30, 2013. The new company is called Dex Media (not to be confused with the original Dex Media).

The merger reunites directory operations formerly part of Ameritech in Illinois, Verizon, and Qwest, all of which haven't been under common ownership since the Bell System divestiture in 1983.

See also
Dex Media - Company acquired in 2006
RR Donnelley - otherwise unrelated company founded by the father of Reuben H. Donnelley

References

External links
 

Companies based in Cary, North Carolina
Companies listed on the New York Stock Exchange
Publishing companies established in 2010
Telephone directory publishing companies of the United States